Pterocaulon is a genus of flowering plants in the sunflower family, native to North and South America and to Australasia. Blackroot is a common name for species native to North America.

The plants are perennial herbs, frequently densely covered with woolly hairs. The generic name means "winged stem," referring to the decurrent leaf bases that give the appearance of wings running down the sides of the stems.

 Species
 Pterocaulon alopecuroides - South America, Puerto Rico, Virgin Islands
 Pterocaulon angustifolium - Brazil, Argentina, Paraguay, Uruguay
 Pterocaulon balansae - Brazil, Argentina, Paraguay, Uruguay
 Pterocaulon cordobense - Brazil, Argentina, Paraguay, Uruguay
 Pterocaulon globuliflorus - Western Australia, Northern Territory
 Pterocaulon lanatum - Brazil, Bolivia, Paraguay, Salta
 Pterocaulon lorentzii - Brazil, Argentina, Paraguay, Uruguay, Bolivia
 Pterocaulon niveum - Western Australia, Northern Territory
 Pterocaulon polypterum - Brazil, Argentina, Uruguay
 Pterocaulon polystachyum - Brazil, Argentina, Paraguay, Uruguay
 Pterocaulon purpurascens - Mato Grosso, Argentina, Paraguay, Bolivia
 Pterocaulon pycnostachyum  - United States (AL GA FL SC NC)
 Pterocaulon redolens - Indochina, Hainan, Orissa, Philippines, Maluku, New Guinea, eastern Australia
 Pterocaulon rugosum - Brazil, Argentina, Paraguay
 Pterocaulon serrulatum - Western Australia, Northern Territory, South Australia
 Pterocaulon sphacelatum - Australia
 Pterocaulon sphaeranthoides - Western Australia, Northern Territory, Queensland
 Pterocaulon spicatum - South America
 Pterocaulon verbascifolium - Western Australia, Northern Territory, Queensland
 Pterocaulon virgatum - Central + South America, West Indies, United States (TX LA)

References

 
Asteraceae genera
Taxa named by Stephen Elliott